the singular of hastati, a class of infantry in the armies of the early Roman Republic who originally fought as spearmen

Species Latin names

 A. hastatus
 Amphineurus hastatus, Alexander, 1925, a crane fly species in the genus Amphineurus
 D. hastatus
 Dendryphantes hastatus, Clerck, 1757, a jumping spider species in the genus Dendryphantes with a palearctic distribution
 O. hastatus
 Odontomachus hastatus, Fabricius, 1804, a carnivorous ant species in the genus Odontomachus
 S. hastatus
 Saccoderma hastatus, a fish species in the genus Saccoderma found in the Magdalena river in Colombia
 Serrasalmus hastatus, a piranha species in the genus Serrasalmus
 T. hastatus
 Thermocyclops hastatus antillensis, a crustacean species in the genus Thermocyclops

Subspecies
 Thermocyclops schmeili hastatus, a crustacean species in the genus Thermocyclops

See also
 Hastata (disambiguation)
 Hastatum